The following article concerns the performance of Brazil at the 2010 FIFA World Cup. Brazil won both their initial qualification group and their group during the tournament itself. They reached the quarter-final stages where they were knocked out by the eventual tournament runners-up, the Netherlands.

Qualification

Brazil finished top of the CONMEBOL league table. Matches were played from October 2007 to October 2009.

Final positions

Pre-tournament friendlies

Squad
Coach: Carlos Dunga

The selection was characterized by the omission of several fully fit high-profile attacking players, such as Ronaldo, Ronaldinho, Adriano, and Alexandre Pato, as well as the 18-year-old domestic talent Neymar.

Group stages

Brazil vs Korea DPR

Brazil vs Ivory Coast

Portugal vs Brazil

Final table

Round of 16

Quarter-finals
The Netherlands came from behind to beat Brazil 2–1, handing the Brazilians their first loss in a World Cup match held outside Europe, other than in a penalty shootout, since 1950.

References

 
Countries at the 2010 FIFA World Cup